KAYW (98.1 FM, "The Drive") is a radio station licensed to serve Meeker, Colorado, United States.  The station is owned by Western Slope Communications, LLC.

KAYW broadcasts a classic rock music format, simulcasting KZKS 105.3 FM Rifle, Colorado. It is an affiliate of the Floydian Slip syndicated Pink Floyd program.

The station was assigned the KAYW call sign by the Federal Communications Commission on December 8, 1997.

References

External links

AYW
Classic rock radio stations in the United States
Radio stations established in 2000
Rio Blanco County, Colorado
2000 establishments in Colorado